The Net is a 1975 West German drama film directed by Manfred Purzer and starring Mel Ferrer.

Cast

References

External links

1975 films
1975 drama films
1970s psychological thriller films
Films about tabloid journalism
Films about writers
Films based on Austrian novels
Films set in Italy
Films scored by Klaus Doldinger
German drama films
1970s German-language films
West German films
1970s German films